William Emery (died 1431/1432), of Canterbury, Kent, was an English politician and lawyer.

Family
Emery was married twice. Before September 1409, he married a woman named Christine. He later married Agnes.

Career
Emery was a Member of Parliament for Canterbury, Kent, in May 1413.

References

People from Canterbury
Year of birth missing
14th-century births
1432 deaths
English MPs May 1413